Before I Forget is a 1982 album by Jon Lord, featuring a largely conventional eight-song line-up, no orchestra.  The bulk of the songs are either mainstream rock tracks ("Hollywood Rock and Roll", "Chance on a Feeling") or, specifically on Side Two, a series of very English classical piano ballads sung by mother and daughter duo, Vicki Brown and Sam Brown (wife and daughter of entertainer Joe Brown) and vocalist Elmer Gantry. The album also features prolific session drummer (and National Youth Jazz Orchestra alumnus) Simon Phillips, Cozy Powell, Neil Murray, Simon Kirke, Boz Burrell and Mick Ralphs. Lord used synthesizers more than before, principally to retain an intimacy with the material and to create a jam atmosphere with old friends like Tony Ashton.

Track listing
All songs written by Jon Lord, except for "Say It's Alright" written by Jon Lord and Elmer Gantry.
Side One
 "Chance on a Feeling" – 4:06
 "Tender Babes" (O Ye Tender Babes) (Thomas Tallis, arr. by Jon Lord) – 4:04
 "Hollywood Rock And Roll – 4:06
 "Bach Onto This" (Toccata and Fugue in D minor, BWV 565) (Johann Sebastian Bach, Jon Lord arr. by Jon Lord)– 7:59
Side Two
 "Before I Forget" – 5:04
 "Say Its Alright" – 4:47
 "Burntwood" – 4:00
 "Where Are You?" – 5:00
CD reissue bonus tracks (1999)
 "Going Home"
 "Pavane" (Maurice Ravel, arr. by Jon Lord)
 "Lady"
 "For A Friend"

Personnel
 Jon Lord - piano, organ, keyboards, mini Moog
 Vicky Brown - lead (6, 11) and backing (1, 3, 5, 6) vocals
 Tony Ashton - lead vocals (3)
 Elmer Gantry - lead vocals (8)
 Sam Brown - backing vocals (1, 3, 5, 6)
 Bernie Marsden - guitar (1, 4), lead vocals (1)
 Mick Ralphs - guitar (3, 6)
 Neil Murray - bass (1, 2, 4-7)
 Boz Burrell - bass (3)
 Ian Paice - drums (1, 5)
 Simon Phillips - drums (4, 6)
 Cozy Powell - drums (2)
 Simon Kirke - drums (3)

Production notes
 Produced by Jon Lord
 Assisted by Guy Bidmead
 Engineered by Guy Bidmead
 Assistant engineer: Mike Johnson
 Mixed by Guy Bidmead and Mike Johnson
 Recorded at Britannia Row Studios, Sep 1981 and Feb-March 1982

Singles
 "Bach Onto This (edit)" / "Going Home" (UK, March 1982)

References

1982 albums
Jon Lord albums
Harvest Records albums
Purple Records albums